Tracey Perkins (born August 28, 1968, in Houston, Texas is a former American football defensive back in the Arena Football League. He played college football at Lamar. Perkins was the 1997 Arena Football League Defensive Player of the Year Award winner.

Perkins played for the Tampa Bay Storm and San Jose SaberCats.

College career
Perkins attended Lamar University in Beaumont, Texas, where he lettered as a member of the football team during the 1985–1988 seasons.

References

1968 births
Living people
American football cornerbacks
American football safeties
Lamar Cardinals football players
Tampa Bay Storm players
San Jose SaberCats players